Ștefan Călin Pănoiu (born 23 September 2002) is a Romanian professional footballer who plays as a central midfielder for Liga I club Rapid București.

Club career

Rapid București
He made his Liga I debut for Rapid București against Chindia Targoviste on 18 July 2021.

Career statistics

Club

Honours
Rapid București
Liga III: 2018–19

References

External links
 
 
 

2002 births
Living people
Sportspeople from Râmnicu Vâlcea
Romanian footballers
Association football midfielders
Liga I players
Liga II players
Liga III players
Romania youth international footballers
FC Rapid București players